Sunkist Fruit Gems are Half Dollar sized pectin candies.

They are a soft round candy made from powdered sugar with fruit flavors.  Fruit Gems are made by Jelly Belly, which purchased prior manufacturer, The Ben Myerson Candy Company, under license for Sunkist.  They contain real fruit pectin, natural flavors and are fatless.

Prior to 2012, Fruit Gems came in a mix of lemon, orange, grapefruit, lime and raspberry flavors.  In 2012 the flavor lineup was changed to lemon, orange, grapefruit, raspberry and blueberry.

A Christmas seasonal mix, with green lime and red raspberry fruit gems, has also been produced.

Sunkist Fruit Gems do not contain gluten or any wheat by-products.

References

Brand name confectionery
Candy

Gems Manufacturing Machinery Photos